Agora ("Now") is a solo album by the Brazilian percussionist Paulinho da Costa. It was released in 1977 via Pablo Records.

Critical reception
AllMusic wrote that "those phobic to memories of avocado shag carpeting will want to avoid Agora, but it's worth checking out for both hipster ironists and Brazilian jazz fans." Gramophone called the album "full of intricate and exotic rhythms."

Track listing
"Simbora" (Paulinho da Costa, Claudio Slon) – 8:48
"Terra" (Paulinho da Costa, Octavio Bailly, Jr., Claudio Slon) – 4:25
"Toledo Bagel" (Paulinho da Costa, Erich Bulling, Claudio Slon) – 5:53
"Berimbau Variations" (Paulinho da Costa, Octavio Bailly, Jr., Claudio Slon) – 3:53
"Belisco" (Erich Bulling) – 6:39
"Ritmo Number One" (Paulinho da Costa, Claudio Slon) – 8:28

Personnel
Paulinho da Costa - Percussion, Arranger, Vocals, Lyricist, Bongos, Conga, Pandeiro, Ocarina, Triangle, Whistle, Tambourim, Berimbau, Repique, Surdo, Cuica, Reco-Reco, Shaker, Guiro, Wood Block, Waterphone, Bell Tree, Cabasa, Agogo, Spoons, Frying Pan, African Shakers 
Erich Bulling - Arranger
Greg Phillinganes - Piano, Keyboards, Electric Piano
Claudio Slon - Synthesizer, Percussion, Arranger, Drums, Timbales, Vocals, Lyricist, Water Drums, Synthesized Percussion
Lee Ritenour - Guitar
Octavio Bailly Jr. - Bass, Vocals 
Gene Goe - Trumpet, Flugelhorn
Steve Huffsteter  - Trumpet, Arranger, Flugelhorn
Larry Williams - Flute, Saxophone
Mike Julian  - Trombone
Frank Rosolino  - Trombone

Production
Claudio Slon - Producer
Paulinho da Costa - Producer
Humberto Gatica - Engineer 
Geoff Gillette - Engineer 
Phil Stern - Photography 
Phil De Lancie - Digital Remastering

References

External links
Paulinho Da Costa at Discogs

1977 albums
Pablo Records albums
Paulinho da Costa albums